Danel Castro Muñagorri (born July 2, 1976, in Las Tunas, Cuba) is a Cuban baseball player and Olympic silver medalist.

References 
 
 

1976 births
Living people
Leñadores de Las Tunas players
Olympic baseball players of Cuba
Olympic medalists in baseball
Olympic silver medalists for Cuba
Medalists at the 2000 Summer Olympics
Baseball players at the 2000 Summer Olympics
Pan American Games gold medalists for Cuba
Baseball players at the 1999 Pan American Games
Pan American Games medalists in baseball
Central American and Caribbean Games gold medalists for Cuba
Competitors at the 1998 Central American and Caribbean Games
Central American and Caribbean Games medalists in baseball
Medalists at the 1999 Pan American Games
People from Las Tunas (city)